A list of films produced in Egypt in 1995. For an A-Z list of films currently on Wikipedia, see :Category:Egyptian films.

External links
 Egyptian films of 1995 at the Internet Movie Database
 Egyptian films of 1995 elCinema.com

Lists of Egyptian films by year
1995 in Egypt
Lists of 1995 films by country or language